Stuckman Cottage is a historic cure cottage located at Saranac Lake, town of North Elba in Essex and Franklin County, New York.  It was built between 1897 and 1900 as a single family residence.  It is a three-story, rectangular, gable-roofed wood-frame dwelling with numerous additions layered over each other over the years and has Colonial Revival style details. The interior is divided into apartments, one per floor, and it features a glass-enclosed verandah and multiple glazed cure porches.  It was operated as a boarding cottage with care starting in 1925.

It was listed on the National Register of Historic Places in 1992.

References

Houses on the National Register of Historic Places in New York (state)
Colonial Revival architecture in New York (state)
Houses completed in 1900
Houses in Franklin County, New York
National Register of Historic Places in Franklin County, New York